Benstonea humilis (previously placed in the genus Pandanus) is a species of plant in the family Pandanaceae, with no subspecies listed.  It has been recorded from Indo-China and peninsular Malaysia; in Vietnam, it is called dưa nhỏ (literally small "[forest] pineapple").

Gallery

References

External links 
 
 

humilis
Flora of Indo-China